The Slovenská Basketbalová Liga (SBL) is the highest level tier league of men's professional club basketball in Slovakia. The league was founded in 1993. MBK Pezinok is the league's most successful team, having won a league record 9 championships. Before 2014, the league was named the Extraliga.

Current clubs
The following 7 teams participated in the 2020–21 Slovak Basketball League:

Finals

Performance by club

See also
Slovak Cup

External links
 
Slovak league on Eurobasket.com

 
Professional sports leagues in Slovakia